was a Japanese professional wrestling event co-produced by Apache Pro-Wrestling Army, Big Japan Pro Wrestling (BJW), DDT Pro-Wrestling (DDT), International Wrestling Association of Japan (IWA Japan), Kaientai Dojo (K-Dojo), Michinoku Pro Wrestling (M-Pro) and Osaka Pro Wrestling (OPW) on December 31, 2007 at Korakuen Hall, with the participation of wrestlers from All Japan Pro Wrestling (AJPW), Battlarts, Dragon Gate (DG), New Japan Pro-Wrestling (NJPW), Pro Wrestling Zero1-Max, Toryumon Mexico,  (WMF) and Wrestling of Darkness 666.

The event featured a mixture of wrestlers from different independent promotions facing each other in a total of nine matches. The main event was a six-man tag team match between the teams of Shuji Kondo (El Dorado), Yoshihito Sasaki (Zero1) and Daisuke Sekimoto (BJW), and Kengo Mashimo (K-Dojo), Harashima (DDT) and Tetsuhiro Kuroda (Apache).

Production

Background
Following the success of the 2006 Indy Summit, Taka Michinoku, who was in charge of the event, created the Pro-Wrestling Summit Committee to hold more joint shows. Summits were held in Osaka, Ariake and eventually at Korakuen Hall on New Year's Eve, thus continuing the tradition of the December 31 Korakuen Hall Show. The event was broadcast on Samurai! TV and Gaora.

Storylines
The Pro-Wrestling Summit in Korakuen featured nine professional wrestling matches that resulted from scripted storylines, where wrestlers portrayed villains, heroes, or less distinguishable characters in the scripted events that built tension and culminated in a wrestling match or series of matches.

Results

References

2007 in professional wrestling
Active Advance Pro Wrestling
Big Japan Pro Wrestling shows
DDT Pro-Wrestling shows
International Wrestling Association of Japan
Osaka Pro Wrestling
Professional wrestling in Tokyo
Professional wrestling joint events